Matthew (died 1199) was a 12th-century churchman residing in Scotland. He is the first man known to have held the position of Archdeacon of St Andrews, his first known ecclesiastical post. He occurs in this office in a document which can be dated to some point between August 1147 and June 1152. Bishop Edward, Bishop of Aberdeen, died in 1172 and Archdeacon Matthew was elected as the successor. He was consecrated on 2 April 1172.

Matthew was the principal prelate in charge of the consecration of John the Scot at Holyrood Abbey on 15 June 1180. Matthew maintained his links with Fife, appearing in numerous charters relating to that province. He had a brother named Odo who was the dapifer ("steward") of Ernald, Bishop of St Andrews (1160–63). His family may have been the one that eventually took the locative surname "de Kininmund" (or variants). He died on 20 August 1199 and was succeeded by John, the prior of Kelso Abbey.

References
 Dowden, John, The Bishops of Scotland, ed. J. Maitland Thomson, (Glasgow, 1912), pp. 99–100
 Innes, Cosmo, Registrum Episcopatus Aberdonensis: Ecclesie Cathedralis Aberdonensis Regesta Que Extant in Unum Collecta, Vol. 1, (Edinburgh, 1845), pp. xx-i
 Keith, Robert, An Historical Catalogue of the Scottish Bishops: Down to the Year 1688, (London, 1924), pp. 104–5
 Watt, D.E.R., Fasti Ecclesiae Scotinanae Medii Aevi ad annum 1638, 2nd Draft, (St Andrews, 1969), pp. 1, 304

12th-century births
1199 deaths
Bishops of Aberdeen
Scoto-Normans
12th-century Scottish Roman Catholic bishops